"Like Yesterday" is Japanese band the Brilliant Green's 18th single, released on February 24, 2010. It was the band's first release with Warner after 11 years with Defstar Records, and their first since their greatest hits collection Complete Single Collection '97–'08.

Track listing

Chart rankings

Reported sales

References

External links
Warner Like Yesterday profile 

2010 singles
2010 songs
Songs written by Shunsaku Okuda
Songs written by Tomoko Kawase
The Brilliant Green songs
Warner Music Japan singles